Andrej Panadić (born 9 March 1969) is a Croatian football manager and a former defender. Besides Croatia, he has played in Germany, Austria, and Japan.

Playing career

Club
He played for Dinamo Zagreb (1988–1994), Chemnitzer FC (1994–1996), KFC Uerdingen 05 (1996), Hamburger SV (1997–2002), Sturm Graz (2001–2002), and Nagoya Grampus Eight (2002–2004).

With Dinamo Zagreb he won a Croatian championship in 1993.

International
Panadić made his debut for Yugoslavia in a September 1989 friendly match against Greece, coming on as a 62nd-minute substitute for Predrag Spasić and earned a total of 3 caps, scoring no goals. He was a non-playing squad member at the 1990 FIFA World Cup so his final international was a December 1989 friendly away against England.

Managerial career
In January 2016, Panadić was named manager of Istra 1961, after managing Radnik Velika Gorica and Austrian side LASK Linz as well as acting as an assistant to Branko Ivanković in Saudi Arabia, the United Arab Emirates and Iran. He replaced Nikola Jaroš as manager of Rudar Velenje in October 2019 but was dismissed himself in April 2020.

He took charge of Kosovan side Ferizaj in October 2022, with the club bottom of the table.

Career statistics

Club

International

References

External links
 
 
 Andrej Panadić – Povijest Dinama 

1969 births
Living people
Footballers from Zagreb
Association football defenders
Yugoslav footballers
Yugoslavia international footballers
1990 FIFA World Cup players
Croatian footballers
GNK Dinamo Zagreb players
Chemnitzer FC players
KFC Uerdingen 05 players
Hamburger SV players
SK Sturm Graz players
Nagoya Grampus players
Yugoslav First League players
Croatian Football League players
2. Bundesliga players
Bundesliga players
Austrian Football Bundesliga players
J1 League players
Croatian expatriate footballers
Expatriate footballers in Germany
Croatian expatriate sportspeople in Germany
Expatriate footballers in Austria
Croatian expatriate sportspeople in Austria
Expatriate footballers in Japan
Croatian expatriate sportspeople in Japan
Croatian football managers
LASK managers
NK Istra 1961 managers
NK Krško managers
NK Rudar Velenje managers
KF Ferizaj managers
Croatian Football League managers
Croatian expatriate football managers
Expatriate football managers in Austria
Expatriate football managers in Slovenia
Croatian expatriate sportspeople in Slovenia
Expatriate football managers in Kosovo
Croatian expatriate sportspeople in Kosovo
Persepolis F.C. non-playing staff
Croatian expatriate sportspeople in Iran
Croatian expatriate sportspeople in Saudi Arabia
Croatian expatriate sportspeople in the United Arab Emirates